John Byrom (born 28 July 1944 in Blackburn, Lancashire) is an English former footballer.

Signed by his home town club, Blackburn Rovers where he had won England international youth honours, he played over 100 games for them before being signed in the summer of 1966 by near neighbours Bolton Wanderers for £25,000. Originally signed to partner Francis Lee and Wyn Davies, when both players quickly left, Byrom became the senior striker. As Bolton moved between the second and third divisions of English football, he scored 130 goals in his ten years at Burnden Park, including twenty when Bolton won the Third Division title in 1973, before moving back to Blackburn for a final season, retiring in 1977 with a knee injury.

The Bolton fans' song for him was "Someone scored a goal, John Byrom" to the tune of cumbaya.

On retiring, he took many jobs including driving, sweeping and selling cars before finally setting up his own gas cylinder business, from which he retired in the mid-1990s. He now lives in the Ribble Valley.

References

1944 births
Living people
Blackburn Rovers F.C. players
Bolton Wanderers F.C. players
Association football forwards
Footballers from Blackburn
English Football League players
English footballers